Matthew MacKendree Lanter (born April 1, 1983) is an American actor and model. He began his modeling career in 2004. The same year, he acted in the film Bobby Jones: Stroke of Genius and the television series Point Pleasant. He went on to appear in numerous television series and films, including Commander in Chief and 90210. He later voiced Anakin Skywalker in the animated film Star Wars: The Clone Wars, continuing to portray him in the identically named TV show and other media of the Star Wars franchise.

Early life
Lanter was born on April 1, 1983, in Massillon, Ohio. His father worked in insurance, and his mother was a school secretary. He has one older sister. When Lanter was eight, the family moved to Atlanta, Georgia. Lanter played baseball in his youth and was a batboy with the Atlanta Braves for two seasons. He majored in business at the University of Georgia.

Career
In 2004, Lanter was a contestant on Bravo's reality show Manhunt: The Search for America's Most Gorgeous Male Model. He did not win the competition. In November of that year, Lanter appeared as a caddie in the biographical film Bobby Jones: Stroke of Genius. Between June and July 2005, Lanter appeared in three episodes of the Fox supernatural drama series Point Pleasant, playing the role of Nick. The show received low ratings and did not last a full season. He has since appeared in television shows such as Grey's Anatomy and Big Love. In April 2005, he signed on to become a series regular portraying the role of Horace Calloway on ABC's political drama series Commander in Chief. The series premiered in September 2005, ran for one season and was cancelled in June 2006.

In 2008, he took on the lead role as Zach Conroy in The Cutting Edge: Chasing the Dream, as a member of a figure skating pair. Later that year, Lanter starred in Disaster Movie as the character Will. The film later appeared on Empire's 2010 poll The 50 Worst Movies Ever, in which it scored number 14. Lanter appeared in the slasher film Sorority Row, which was released in September 2009. It received negative reviews from both critics and audiences.

In 2009, he began a major recurring role on The CW's 90210 portraying Liam Court. In March 2010, he signed on for another parody project with Jason Friedberg and Aaron Seltzer, 20th Century Fox's Vampires Suck. He played Edward Sullen, a spoof of Edward Cullen from the Twilight saga. The film was released in August 2010. In 2011, Lanter appeared in the psychological thriller The Roommate as Jason. Although it received unfavorable reviews from critics, it was a moderate success at box office in North America; however, it was overshadowed by that year's Super Bowl. In 2012, he worked on the films Liars All and A Chance of Rain. He also voices Harry Osborn, Flash Thompson and Venom in the TV series Ultimate Spider-Man, which premiered on April 1, 2012. He also voiced the role of Sled in Secret of the Wings, which was released later that year.

In March 2013, Lanter was cast as a co-star in The CW's science fiction drama series Star-Crossed (originally titled Oxygen). Star-Crossed is about a romance between a human girl and an alien boy (Lanter) when he and six others of his kind are integrated into a suburban high school 10 years after they landed on Earth and were consigned to an internment camp. In 2016, Lanter began playing the role of Wyatt Logan in the NBC series Timeless. Its second season was broadcast in early 2018, but the series was not renewed by NBC. In February 2019, it was announced that Lanter was cast as George Hutchence in the Netflix superhero series Jupiter's Legacy.

Star Wars
Lanter played Jedi Knight Anakin Skywalker in the 2008 animated film Star Wars: The Clone Wars and later all seven seasons of the TV series of the same name. He has stated that his fellow cast members and the other people who worked on the show are "like family" to him. He also portrayed the character in Star Wars Battlefront II and Star Wars Rebels. He has said that Hayden Christensen, the actor who had previously had the role of Anakin in Star Wars: Episode II – Attack of the Clones and Episode III – Revenge of the Sith, had a "very, very difficult job" demonstrating the character's arc from hero to villain, and considers himself fortunate that he had more time than Christensen to show the transformation. 

In an interview, Lanter explained how he had not known for whom he was auditioning when trying for the role of Anakin. He was told he would be playing a character called "Deak Starkiller", who Dave Filoni, the director of the Star Wars: The Clone Wars animated film, suggested he portray as a mixture of Luke Skywalker and Han Solo. Lanter had minor roles in Episode VII: The Force Awakens (2015) as various alien scavengers and stormtroopers. On December 13, 2019, he appeared in The Mandalorian episode "Chapter 6: The Prisoner", portraying Lant Davan, a New Republic soldier. He returned to his role as the voice of Anakin Skywalker in the miniseries Tales of the Jedi, which became available on Disney+ on October 26, 2022.

Personal life
Lanter married his longtime girlfriend Angela Stacy on June 14, 2013. The two had been in a relationship since 2009. They had a daughter together in 2017. In March 2022, Lanter underwent emergency surgery for a closed-loop intestinal obstruction, which had given him "intense abdominal pain". He is a Christian.

Filmography

Film

Television

Video games

References

External links

 
 

1983 births
Living people
American Christians
American male film actors
American male television actors
American male video game actors
American male voice actors
Male actors from Atlanta
Male actors from Ohio
Male models from Ohio
People from Massillon, Ohio
Reality modeling competition participants
University of Georgia alumni
21st-century American male actors